Song Chaoqing (born March 21, 1991) is a Chinese biathlete. She was on a gold medal winning team at the eleventh National Winter Games and is expected to compete for China at the 2010 Winter Olympics.

References 

1991 births
Living people
Biathletes at the 2010 Winter Olympics
Biathletes at the 2014 Winter Olympics
Chinese female biathletes
Olympic biathletes of China
Universiade medalists in biathlon
Universiade gold medalists for China
Competitors at the 2009 Winter Universiade